Tzu Chi University (TCU) is a private university in Hualien City, Hualien County, Taiwan. It was founded by the Tzu Chi Foundation (NGO) and is famous in Taiwan for the quality of the medical education it provides. TCU has strong ties with Hualien Tzu Chi General Hospital (on the same premises as the university) as well as five teaching hospitals in other parts of Taiwan.

History
The institution was established as the Tzu Chi Medical College in April 1994. Humanities and social science students have been accepted since 1998, when the name was changed to Tzu Chi College of Medicine and Humanities. In July 2000, the name was changed to Tzu Chi University.

Organization

Tzu Chi University is headed by a president and a board of trustees. The university is organized into four colleges that contain 18 research institutes and 17 academic departments.

College of Medicine
School of Medicine
Master Program in Biochemistry
Master Program in Microbiology and Immunology
Master Program in Physiological and Anatomical Medicine
Master/PhD Program in Pharmacology and Toxicology
Graduate Institute of Medical Science
Department of Nursing
Department of Medical Informatics
Department of Public Health
Department of Laboratory Medicine & Biotechnology
Department of Physical Therapy
Department of Life Science
Graduate Institute of Life Science
Department of Molecular Biology and Human Genetics
Graduate Institute of Molecular Biology and Human Genetics

College of Humanities & Social Science
Department of Human Development & Psychology
Department of Social Work
Institute of Religion
Institute of Social Work
Department of Oriental Philology

College of Education & Communication
Department of Communication
Department of Child Development and Family Studies
Institute of Education
Center for Teacher Education
Center for General Education
Center for Physical Education

International College 

 Department of English Language and Literature
 Bachelor Program in Management of Service Industries
 Foreign Language Education Center
 Chinese Language Center
 Media Production and Education Center

Academic centers
Medical Simulation Center
Doping Control Center
Animal Experimentation Center
Continuing Education Center
Tzuchi University Radio Station (FM 88.3 MHz)

Campus facilities

Library: Around 350,000 volumes and Internet connection to other libraries in Taiwan.
Information System Center: Computer training courses for students, staff, and faculty and a multimedia room. 
Gymnasium: Indoor facilities for badminton, basketball, table tennis, aerobics, and fitness, an indoor Olympic standard swimming pool, and outdoor basketball courts, tennis courts, volleyball courts, and a jogging track.
On-campus dormitories: Four students share one room with a bathroom.
Cafeteria: vegetable meals, NT$15 for breakfast, NT$25 for lunch and dinner.

Extracurricular activities
The university had 56 student clubs or societies in 2010.

Tradition
10 km Road Race: Before students graduated, every undergraduate had to run the race in 80 minutes biyearly. Starting from 2013, however, it is no longer required for students to participate.

Presidents
 February 1993-May 2000, Lee Ming-liang (李明亮), MD-PhD: Minister of the Department of Health of the Republic of China, 2000-2002
 March 2001-July 2002, C.-F. Lan (藍忠孚), PhD.
 December 2002-November 2005, Jye – Siung Fang (方菊雄), PhD.
 March 2006-July 2019, Pen-Jung Wang (王本榮), MD-PhD.
 August 2019- , Ingrid Y. Liu (劉怡均), PhD.

Ranking 
Top 4000 World Universities: 821 (webometric, Jan 2011)Top 4000 World Universities: 1217 (webometric, Jan 2010)

International academic exchanges

Sister schools

 United States
University of California, Berkeley
Cy-Fair College
Colorado College
Indiana University
California State Polytechnic University, Pomona
 Canada
University of British Columbia
First Nations University of Canada
 Australia
Griffith University
 China
Peking University
Shanghai Jiao Tong University
Central South University
Sun Yat-Sen University
 Hong Kong
University of Hong Kong
 Japan
Bukkyo University
Shukutoku University
Shokei Gakuin University
 Taiwan
National Chiao Tung University
National Chung Hsing University
National Taipei University of Technology
 Korea
Honam University
 Malaysia
University of Malaya
Universiti Sains Malaysia
Universiti Tunku Abdul Rahman
Malay College Kuala Kangsar
 Thailand
Mahidol University
Songkhla Rajabhat University
Chulalongkorn University
Khon Kaen University
Sripatum University
 Philippines
University of Santo Tomas
St. Luke's College of Medicine
Angeles University Foundation
 Sweden
Halmstad University
 Indonesia
University of Indonesia
 Nicaragua
Universidad de Ciencias Comerciales
 Vietnam
Ho Chi Minh City University of Foreign Languages and Information Technology
 Venezuela
Universidad Central de Venezuela

Transportation
The university is within walking distance west from Hualien Station of Taiwan Railways.

See also 
 List of Chinese language schools in Taiwan

References

Universities and colleges in Hualien County
Buddhist universities and colleges in Taiwan
Educational institutions established in 1994
1994 establishments in Taiwan
Tzu Chi
Hualien City